N. Rajan (born 27 November 1956) is an Indian politician and a leader of the Communist Party of India (CPI). He was a member of the 8th KLA 10th KLA and 11th KLA representing the Kilimanoor constituency.

References

Communist Party of India politicians from Kerala
1956 births
Living people
Place of birth missing (living people)